Oh Eun-su (born January 4, 1993) is a South Korean curler. He competed in the 2018 Winter Olympics as the second on the South Korean men's team skipped by Kim Chang-min. In April 2018, he competed at the 2018 World Men's Curling Championship, where the South Korean men's team took fourth place in their best performance to date.

References

1993 births
Living people
People from Gumi, North Gyeongsang
Curlers at the 2018 Winter Olympics
South Korean male curlers
Olympic curlers of South Korea
Pacific-Asian curling champions
Universiade gold medalists for South Korea
Universiade medalists in curling
Competitors at the 2011 Winter Universiade
21st-century South Korean people